Charyn National Park (Şaryn ūlttyq tabiği parkı) officially, Charyn Canyon National Nature Park is a national park in Kazakhstan, stretching along the Charyn River, including Charyn Canyon. The Canyon, with its thinly stratified red sedimentary rock, is said to resemble the Grand Canyon in the US; it is however smaller - 50 km from end to end. About  in size, the park occupies portions of Enbekshikazakh District, Raiymbek District, and Uygur District of Almaty Region. It is about 200 km east of the city of Almaty. The park was established in 2004 to protect the geological attractions of the canyon, the ecological fragility of the river and desert system (including relic Sogdian Ash groves), and surrounding archaeological sites; portions are also set aside for recreation.

Topography

The park is long and thin, protecting both banks of the Charyn River for 50 km, but only to a width of 3 km. The Charyn River at this point runs southwest to northeast through arid foothills of the Tian Shan Mountains 30 km to the south. The canyon reaches 370 meters in depth, and its base is approximately 1,100 meters above sea level. The park protects four main sites:
 Ulken Buguty is in the northeast foothills of the small Ulken Bugty mountain range.  The hills include mineral complexes and geology of scientific interest, as well as an area targeted for expansion of gazelle herds.
 Kyzyl Karasai protects habitat for grazing and breeding gazelles, as well as a relic forest of ash trees and sources of mineral waters. 
 Charyn Canyon follows the main course of the Charyn River.  The canyon reaches 370 meters in depth, and base is approximately 1,100 meters above sea level.
 Aktogay Canyon follows the Charyn River below the Charyn Canyon.
Four levels of protection are provided for different sub-areas of the park: Reserve Status Area (9,427.5 hectares), Zone of Environmental Stabilization (13,147.3 hectares), Tourism and Recreation Area (77,739 hectares), and a Zone of Limited Economic Activity (26,736.2 hectares).

Climate
The climate is "Cold Semi-Arid Climate" (Koeppen Classification BSk: warm, dry summers with cold winters. 312 mm of precipitation per year (maximum in summer).

Plants and animals
Within the park is the Charyn Ash Grove, a remnant stand of what was once a long forest belt of Sogdian Ash trees (Fraxinus sogdiana) that spread across the northern slopes of the Tian Shan mountains as early as the Paleogene Period. Above the flooplain is a unique community in which the dominant plants include Saxaul (Haloxylon), Eurotia, and Ephedra).

Scientists in the park have recorded 32 species of mammals, 18 of reptiles, 4 of amphibians, 100 of birds, and over 1,000 plants, 50 of which are rare or endemic.

Tourism
There are three tourist routes in the park:
 Charyn Ash Grove: In addition to the trail, there are guest houses and a 'country house' with seating for 100 people.
 Valley of the Castles: The Valley of the Castles takes its name from the shapes of the rock formations in a small side canyon (3 km long, and 200 – 700 meters wide) off the main Charyn River course, with a views out to the main canyon. The sedimentary layers include orange-grey clays, marl, gritstone, and sandstone. The approach is by a 10 km dirt road, with three parking lots at the site. There is food available at two recreational gazebos, and five rest yurts.  
 Cemeteries and Burial Mounds: Located 12 km off the Chundzha-Almaty highway is an area of scattered archaeological sites.

References

External links
 Charyn Canyon National Park on OpenStreetMap
 Charyn Canyon National Park on Google Maps

National parks of Kazakhstan
Geography of Almaty Region
Tourist attractions in Almaty Region